Animal Logic is the debut studio album by American band Animal Logic. It was released in 1989 via I.R.S. Records and Virgin Records.

Track listing

Personnel
Animal Logic
 Deborah Holland – vocals, lyrics
 Stanley Clarke – bass, strings, producer
 Stewart Copeland – drums, drum programming, producer
Additional musicians
 Michael Wood Thompson – guitar, banjo
 Steve Howe – guitar (tracks: 1, 5)
 Peter John Haycock – acoustic guitar (track 4)
 Lakshminarayana Shankar – violin
 Frederick Dewayne Hubbard – trumpet

Technicals
 Jeff Seitz – mixing (tracks: 2-10), recording (tracks: 2-7, 9, 10)
 Chris Lord-Alge – mixing (track 1)
 Csaba Petocz – recording (tracks: 1, 8)
 Will Rogers – recording (tracks: 1, 8)
 Scott Gordon – assistant engineering
 Pete Jones – assistant engineering
 Bernard Grundman – mastering
 Michael Ross – art direction
 Ryan Art – artwork and design
 Paul Cox – photography

Chart history

References

External links

1989 debut albums
Stanley Clarke albums
Stewart Copeland albums
I.R.S. Records albums
Virgin Records albums
Albums produced by Stanley Clarke